Yevgeny Sergeyevich Beryozkin (born 5 July 1996) is a Belarusian footballer playing currently for Kyzylzhar .

Honours
BATE Borisov
Belarusian Premier League champion: 2017, 2018
Belarusian Cup winner: 2019–20
Belarusian Super Cup winner: 2017

Liepāja
Latvian Football Cup winner: 2020

External links
 
 
 Profile at Naftan website

1996 births
Living people
Sportspeople from Vitebsk
Belarusian footballers
Association football midfielders
Belarusian expatriate footballers
Expatriate footballers in Latvia
Expatriate footballers in Kazakhstan
Belarus international footballers
FC Vitebsk players
FC Naftan Novopolotsk players
FC BATE Borisov players
FK Liepāja players
FC Torpedo-BelAZ Zhodino players
FC Kyzylzhar players